Elections were held in the  Autonomous Region in Muslim Mindanao (ARMM) for seats in the House of Representatives of the Philippines on May 10, 2010.

The candidate with the most votes won that district's seat for the 15th Congress of the Philippines.

Note that Isabela, Basilan, despite being a part of the province of Basilan, is not a part of the ARMM. The voters in Isabela vote their representative as part of Basilan's legislative district. On the other hand, Cotabato City, despite not being a part of the ARMM and of Maguindanao, elects their representative as a part of the Maguindanao's 1st district.

Summary
*Invalid votes and turnout for Lanao del Sur's districts are not available.

Basilan

Incumbent Wahab Akbar (Liberal Party) was assassinated at the Batasang Pambansa bombing, the Liberal Party did not nominate anyone as their candidate in this district. Akbar's brother Rajam is Aksyon Demokratiko's candidate.

The result of the election is under protest in the House of Representatives Electoral Tribunal.

Lanao del Sur

1st District
Incumbent Faysah Dumarpa is in her third consecutive term already and is ineligible for reelection. Lakas-Kampi-CMD's nominee in this district is Mohammed Hussein Pacsum Pangandaman, although Dumarpa's husband Salic will run as the candidate of the Nacionalista Party.

2nd District
Pangalian Balindong is the incumbent.

The result of the election is under protest in the House of Representatives Electoral Tribunal.

Maguindanao

1st District
Incumbent Didagen Dilangalen is running as independent.

The result of the election is under protest in the House of Representatives Electoral Tribunal.

2nd District
Incumbent Simeon Datumanong is running unopposed.

Sulu

1st District
Yusop Jikri is the incumbent.

The result of the election is under protest in the House of Representatives Electoral Tribunal.

2nd District
Incumbent Munir Arbison is in his third consecutive term already and is ineligible for reelection; he is running for governor of Sulu. Lakas-Kampi-CMD nominated Asani Tammang as their candidate in this district. Bangon Pilipinas Party nominated Ahmad Jinnul as their candidate in this district. Liberal Party (Philippines) nominated Abdullajid Estino as their candidate in this district.

Tawi-Tawi

Nur Jaafar is the incumbent, running against Sulay Halipa, Anuar Abubakar, Alawadin Bandon Jr, 	and Nasher Sugala.

References

External links
Official website of the Commission on Elections

2010 Philippine general election
2010